Patrocinio Samudio (17 March 1975 in Asunción – 2 October 2017) was a Paraguayan footballer who played for 2 de Mayo of the División Intermedia in Paraguay.

Teams
  Presidente Hayes 1997
  Guaraní 1998
  Nacional 1999
  Universal 2000
  River Plate (Asunción) 2001–2002
  12 de Octubre 2003
  Nacional 2004
  Tacuary 2004–2009
  Fernando de la Mora 2010–2011
  2 de Mayo 2012–2017

References
 
 

1975 births
2017 deaths
Paraguayan footballers
Club Nacional footballers
Club Guaraní players
Club Tacuary footballers
2 de Mayo footballers
12 de Octubre Football Club players
Sport Colombia footballers
River Plate (Asunción) footballers
Club Presidente Hayes footballers
Sportspeople from Asunción
Association footballers not categorized by position